Dmitry Ivanovich Izvekov (born 25 January 1981) is a former Russian professional association football player.

Club career
He played four seasons in the Russian Football National League for FC Avangard Kursk, FC Zvezda Irkutsk and FC Dynamo Saint Petersburg.

External links

1981 births
Living people
Russian footballers
Association football midfielders
FC Krasnodar players
FC Zvezda Irkutsk players
FC Avangard Kursk players
FC Dynamo Saint Petersburg players
FC Sheksna Cherepovets players